Sana Sarfaraz is a Pakistani actress and model, known for her role as Shehnila in Drama serial Zindagi gulzar hai (2013). She has played the lead role of Areen in Dil Hi To Hai (2017). As a model she has extensive career and has been nominated for several awards including Lux Style Award.

Early life and education
Sarfaraz was  brought up in Abu Dhabi and later moved to Pakistan  when she was 10 and has been working in the media since 2012.

She received her Bachelors in Media Sciences from Iqra University  and her Masters in Advertising from SZABIST in Karachi.

Awards and recognition

Modelling and commercial work 
Sarfaraz has established a career as a model. She has appeared in several TV commercials for international and local brands.

References

External links

Pakistani television actresses
Living people
People from Abu Dhabi
Iqra University alumni
Pakistani female models
Year of birth missing (living people)